Kentropyx paulensis, Boettger's kentropyx, is a species of teiid lizard found in Bolivia and Brazil.

References

paulensis
Reptiles described in 1893
Taxa named by Oskar Boettger